Leslie Edwin Powers (November 5, 1909 – November 13, 1978) was a Major League Baseball first baseman.

Sources

Major League Baseball first basemen
New York Giants (NL) players
Philadelphia Phillies players
Durham Bulls players
Hollywood Stars players
Loyola Marymount Lions baseball players
Sacramento Senators players
San Francisco Seals (baseball) players
Newark Bears (IL) players
Baltimore Orioles (IL) players
Jersey City Giants players
Bakersfield Badgers players
Chattanooga Lookouts players
Minor league baseball managers
Baseball players from California
1909 births
1978 deaths